Hamad Moh'd Al-Midlij (Arabic: حمد محمد المدلج, born 1984) is a politician, who is an elected member of the Municipal council in Kuwait. As the 2018 Kuwaiti Municipal Council election was his first stand for elections, he won the first chair in the fourth constituency with 4,108 out of 75,560 votes. Al-Midlij currently serves as the chair of Financial and Legal Committee of the council.

References 

1984 births
Living people
Kuwaiti politicians